The 1980 Asian Basketball Confederation Championship for Women was held in Hong Kong. It was the eighth women's ABC championship. The winner was South Korea, claiming their sixth title out of eight.

Preliminary round

Group A

Group B

Group C

Final round
 The results and the points of the matches between the same teams that were already played during the preliminary round shall be taken into account for the final round.

Classification 7th–10th

Championship

Final standing

Awards

References
 Results
 archive.fiba.com

1980
1980 in women's basketball
women
International women's basketball competitions hosted by Hong Kong
B
September 1980 sports events in Asia